Batuk may refer to:

 Batuk Vora, Indian journalist
 Birkan Batuk, Turkish basketball player
 Another spelling of Batuque (music), a music and dance genre from Cape Verde
 British Army Training Unit Kenya, a British Army training unit in Kenya
 Batuk, a musical collective consisting of Spoek Mathambo and others
 Batuk or batok, Visayan tattoos of the Philippines
 Batuk (food), a Nepalese fried lentil fritter

Turkish-language surnames